Margaret Atherton (born 1943) is an American philosopher and feminist historian who is currently a Distinguished Professor Emerita in the Department of Philosophy at the University of Wisconsin–Milwaukee, and was a Distinguished Professor of Philosophy there before her retirement. Atherton's research has focused on philosophers of the early modern period, philosophy of psychology (cognition and mind), and the work of women philosophers, as well as teaching the history of modern philosophy.

Education
Atherton attained her A.B. in Philosophy at Bryn Mawr College in 1965. In 1970, she received a Ph.D. in Philosophy from Brandeis University; her dissertation "Nativism" initiated her philosophical work in innate ideas.

Career
Atherton's book Women Philosophers of the Early Modern Period highlights historical women who have impacted philosophy. Atherton has published many articles, been featured in several journals, and asked to present her ideas at conferences and institutions throughout the years.
George Berkeley and John Locke are seen throughout her work and reviews. Atherton has engaged in research since the 1970s and has continued to develop her methods and expand her ideas.

Atherton is a member of the British Society for the History of Philosophy, Hume Society, American Eighteenth Century Society, International Berkeley Society (Philosophy Associations Coordinator), Society for Women in Philosophy, and the American Philosophical Association.

Atherton has been a professor of philosophy at New York University, Brooklyn College, University of Maryland, University of Rochester, and University of Wisconsin-Milwaukee.

Works

References 

Living people
Bryn Mawr College alumni
Brandeis University alumni
University of Wisconsin–Milwaukee faculty
Philosophers from Wisconsin
American women philosophers
American women historians
Feminist historians
20th-century American philosophers
20th-century American historians
21st-century American philosophers
21st-century American historians
20th-century American women writers
21st-century American women writers
Year of birth missing (living people)
Place of birth missing (living people)
Members of the American Philosophical Society
Presidents of the American Philosophical Association
Brooklyn College faculty